The Golden Hinde is a mountain located in the Vancouver Island Ranges on Vancouver Island, British Columbia, Canada. At , it is the highest peak on the island. The peak is popular with experienced backcountry-climbers, having been first ascended in 1913. The mountain is made of basalt which is part of the Karmutsen Formation.

Geography

Name origin
The mountain took its name from Sir Francis Drake's ship, the Golden Hind, by an early fur-trading captain, who was reminded of Drake's ship as sunset hit the mountain (which is visible from the west coast of the Island) and in honour of Drake's reputed presence off the coast of the future British Columbia during the explorer's circumnavigation of the globe from 1577–80 (see New Albion).

The present name was not officially conferred until 1938, but this was done after a reference to the peak in a fur-trader's log. The alternative name "The Rooster's Comb" was used by early alpinists because of the mountain's appearance.

See also
 List of Ultras of North America
 Mountain peaks of Canada
 List of the most prominent summits of North America

References

External links

 
 Strathcona Provincial Park from British Columbia Ministry of Environment website.
 .
 Elite Backpacking - Guiding company specializing in the Golden Hinde

Two-thousanders of British Columbia
Vancouver Island Ranges
Nootka Land District